Květa Peschke and Francesca Schiavone were the defending champions, but Schiavone chose not to participate, and only Peschke competed that year.
Peschke partnered with Rennae Stubbs, but lost in the quarterfinals to Iveta Benešová and Galina Voskoboeva.

Cara Black and Liezel Huber won in the final 4–6, 6–1, 10–7, against Victoria Azarenka and Tatiana Poutchek.

Seeds

  Cara Black /  Liezel Huber (champions)
  Květa Peschke /  Rennae Stubbs (quarterfinals)
  Elena Likhovtseva /  Dinara Safina (semifinals)
  Michaëlla Krajicek /  Vladimíra Uhlířová (first round)

Draw

External links
Draw

Kremlin Cup
Kremlin Cup